Adam Long (born September 25, 1987) is an American professional golfer who won his first PGA Tour event at the 2019 Desert Classic.

Early life 
Long was born in New Orleans, and grew up in St. Louis. He is the son of Gordon and Jane and the brother of Lindsay.  Growing up, Long played multiple sports, especially hockey, but after a leg injury, he focused on golf. He graduated from Francis Howell High School in 2006 and during his time there he was selected to the All-State All-Metro team all four years. In 2008, he won the Metropolitan Amateur Championship, a coveted Amateur title in St. Louis. Originally, Long had verbally committed to play golf at the University of Florida, but eventually decided on Duke University after a second visit.

Collegiate career 
Long started his career at Duke in 2006 and as a freshman, he was second on the team in stroke average (72.9). He had two top-10 finishes on his way to earning an All-ACC team selection. During his sophomore season, he earned three top-10 finishes including a performance at the Coca-Cola Duke Golf Classic where he broke the school's 54-hole record with a score of 208 (−8). In 2008, he was a Ping All-East Selection and led the Blue Devils in stroke average (73.0). Long finished his collegiate career ranking second in Duke's history in stroke average and earned All-America Academic honors for two seasons. He graduated from Duke in 2010 with a degree in Sociology.

Professional career 
Long turned professional in 2010 and played on different smaller tours like the NGA Hooters Tour and the eGolf Tour before earning status in 2014 on the PGA Tour Canada.

PGA Tour Canada 
In 2014, Adam Long made 10 starts on the PGA Tour Canada. In those starts, he had two top-10 finishes coming at the Great Waterway Classic and the Cape Breton Celtic Classic where he finished T2 and T8 respectively.

Korn Ferry Tour 
In 2012, Long played in 17 events on the Korn Ferry Tour and made the cut in six events. From 2015 to 2017, he played in 79 events on the Korn Ferry Tour, finishing inside the top-10 in 7 times including a runner-up finish at the 2015 United Leasing & Finance Championship.

In 2018, Long made 27 starts and finished high enough on the money list to earn his PGA Tour card. En route to earning his way onto the PGA Tour, he had four top-10 results including a runner-up finish at the Lincoln Land Championship. Long secured his PGA Tour card at the Ellie Mae Classic with a T4 finish. He finished 13th on the money list, winning $192,463.

PGA Tour 
2019 was Long's first season on the PGA Tour. After making the cut in only one of his first four starts, Long won the 2019 Desert Classic with a score of 26 under par, beating out Phil Mickelson and Adam Hadwin in a close finish. Long followed up his win a few months later with a T10 finish at the Arnold Palmer Invitational. Long qualified for the FedEx Cup Playoffs in his first year on tour, ultimately finishing in 69th and earning $1,648,007.

In 2020, Long has finished tied for runner-up at the Mayakoba Golf Classic to Brendon Todd, solo 8th place at the Phoenix Open, and solo 2nd at the 3M Open to Michael Thompson.

Professional wins (2)

PGA Tour wins (1)

NGA Hooters Tour wins (1)
2011 Woodcreek Open

Results in major championships
Results not in chronological order in 2020.

CUT = missed the half-way cut
"T" = tied
NT = No tournament due to COVID-19 pandemic

Results in The Players Championship

"T" indicates a tie for a place
CUT = missed the halfway cut
C = Canceled after the first round due to the COVID-19 pandemic

Results in World Golf Championships

1Canceled due to COVID-19 pandemic

"T" = Tied
NT = No tournament

See also
2018 Web.com Tour Finals graduates

References

External links
 
 
 

American male golfers
Duke Blue Devils men's golfers
PGA Tour golfers
Korn Ferry Tour graduates
Golfers from St. Louis
Sportspeople from New Orleans
People from Jupiter, Florida
1987 births
Living people